Marta Kolomayets (April 6, 1959, Chicago – August 16, 2020, Kyiv) was a Ukrainian journalist and social activist; Director of the Fulbright Program in Ukraine, chairman of the Board of the Ukrainian Women's Foundation, the first American journalist to come to Ukraine, journalist of The Ukrainian Weekly (1982–1998), journalist and manager of a number of programs: educational, on local government reforms, on the fight against corruption, on the development of civil society. Together with her husband, Danylo Yanevsky, she was the producer of a film about the life of Patriarch Josyf Slipyj. On August 16, 2020, Kolomayets died at the age of 61 due to a lengthy illness in Kyiv and is buried at the Baikove Cemetery.

Biography 
Marta Kolomayets was born in 1959 to a Ukrainian family in Chicago (USA). Father Anatoliy is from Poltava region, mother Lyubov is from Western Ukraine.

Kolomayets graduated from William Howard Taft High School (Chicago). She later graduated from the University of Illinois at Chicago, where she studied Slavic studies. She later studied journalism at the University of Illinois at Urbana–Champaign.

Since 1985 she has been visiting Ukraine, where she met dissidents. On her second trip to Ukraine (in 1987) she interviewed Vyacheslav Chornovil and Mykhailo Horyn. These videos were later confiscated, and Kolomayets was deported from the Ukrainian SSR on charges of espionage.

In 1991, Kolomayets moved to Ukraine and opened a Ukrainian Weekly bureau in Kyiv, that became the first foreign media outlet to open a bureau in Ukraine. Thus, Kolomayets became the first American journalist to come to independent Ukraine. She worked in Ukrainian Weekly until 1998. During this time, she recorded many testimonies of people who survived the Holodomor of 1932–33. The testimonies were transferred to the US Library of Congress and played an important role in the adoption of the US resolution on the Holodomor in 2018. In addition, Martha talked to Ukrainian dissidents, helped them and also recorded their testimonies.

In 1999–2002 she headed the Ukrainian educational program of market reforms. Kolomayets was the founder of Ukraine's network of press clubs in 25 Ukrainian cities in 1999. In 2004–2007 she was the head of the USAID anti-corruption program "Partnership for a Transparent Society" (2002–2004), and in 2004–2007 — the head of the "Community Partnership" program of the Ukraine-USA Foundation. For the next two years, she headed the Ukrainian office of the National Democratic Institute of International Relations (2007–2009).

In 2010–2012 Kolomayets worked in Chicago (USA) as the director of programs and communications of the Ukrainian Catholic Educational Foundation. She assisted the Ukrainian Catholic University and was a member of the Friends of UCU Committee in the United States and Ukraine. At UCU, she is called "Sister and Closest Friend." As well she supported Metropolitan Andrey Sheptytsky Institute of Eastern Christian Studies for decades.

Kolomayets was an active member of several organizations, such as Help Us Help the Children Orphan Aid and Chicago-Kyiv Sister Cities.

In 2013, Kolomayets became the director of Fulbright in Ukraine, administered by the Institute of International Education (IIE). In the span of 7 years serving as a director, Kolomayets helped more than 300 Ukrainian scholars to pursue education in the United States. Being a director she founded an alumni network of Ukrainian Fulbrighters — the Ukrainian Fulbright Circle with currently 350 members.

External links 

 They came from near and far by Marta Kolomayets (1983)
 Marta Kolomayets. UIA achievement awards honor nine Ukrainian Americans // The Ukrainian Weekly. No. 48, р. 4, 2 December 1990

References 

Ukrainian journalists
People from Chicago
University of Illinois Chicago alumni
University of Illinois Urbana-Champaign College of Media alumni
Fulbright Distinguished Chairs